Soltan-Ali Mirza was the ruler of the Kar-Kiya dynasty from 1478 to 1504/05. Under him, the dynasty reached its apex of power, to such a degree that he fought against the Aq Qoyunlu over the rulership of Qazvin.

Due to several fruitless and taxing expeditions in Bia-pas (western Gilan), he was overthrown by his brother Soltan-Hasan in 1504/5. In 1506, during Soltan-Ali Mirza's attempt to regain the throne, but he and Soltan-Hasan were killed. The throne was shortly taken by Soltan-Hasan's son Soltan-Ahmad, who had previously resided at the court of the Safavid ruler Ismail I.

The cultural prosperity during Soltan-Ali Mirza's ruled is demonstrated by the production of the "Big Head Shahnama" in 1493/94.

References

Sources 
 
 
 

15th-century Iranian people
16th-century Iranian people
15th-century births
1506 deaths